Blöthar the Berserker is the current lead vocalist and occasional bassist in the heavy metal band Gwar. He appears as a stout, pigface, horned goblin. During Gwar's appearance at the 2014 Chicago Riot Fest, the character debuted udders that spray fluid on the crowd, similar to the "Cuttlefish of Cthulu" penile attachment sported by previous Gwar vocalist, Oderus Urungus. Blöthar is usually portrayed wielding a wooden shield and battle-axe.

Background 
According to Gwar mythos, Blöthar came to Earth from Scumdoggia after his awakening shortly after the death of singer Oderus Urungus. Over the decades he had been watching Gwar getting girls and smoking crack off the back of the songs he had written, and he wanted a piece of the action. After a battle for supremacy, he took his place, reigning over Gwar and the Slave Pit.

Blöthar's ceremonial headdress is fashioned from the gigantic antlers and the pelt of a Spectral Moon Moose he killed eons ago. He carries a mighty battle axe, impenetrable shield, and is outfitted with a pair of udders which is the main natural defense mechanism of his species. Blöthar is portrayed by Michael Bishop, who originally played Beefcake the Mighty, from 1988 to 1994, and again from 1998 to 1999.

References 

Gwar
Metal Blade Records artists